Middletown is a city in Montgomery County, Missouri, United States. The population was 171 at the 2020 census.

History
Middletown was laid out in 1834, and so named on account of its location midway in an agricultural district.

Geography
Middletown is located at  (39.127475, -91.414681).

Demographics

2010 census
As of the census of 2010, there were 167 people, 79 households, and 45 families living in the city. The racial makeup of the city was 93.4% White, 0.6% Native American, and 6.0% from two or more races.

There were 79 households, of which 24.1% had children under the age of 18 living with them, 41.8% were married couples living together, 8.9% had a female householder with no husband present, 6.3% had a male householder with no wife present, and 43.0% were non-families. 39.2% of all households were made up of individuals, and 19% had someone living alone who was 65 years of age or older. The average household size was 2.11 and the average family size was 2.80.

The median age in the city was 45.9 years. 19.8% of residents were under the age of 18; 8.4% were between the ages of 18 and 24; 18.6% were from 25 to 44; 28.8% were from 45 to 64; and 24.6% were 65 years of age or older. The gender makeup of the city was 56.3% male and 43.7% female.

2000 census
As of the census of 2000, there were 199 people, 90 households, and 56 families living in the town. The population density was 620.3 people per square mile (240.1/km2). There were 107 housing units at an average density of 333.5 per square mile (129.1/km2). The racial makeup of the town was 99.50% White, and 0.50% from two or more races. Hispanic or Latino of any race were 0.50% of the population.

There were 90 households, out of which 23.3% had children under the age of 18 living with them, 50.0% were married couples living together, 11.1% had a female householder with no husband present, and 36.7% were non-families. 32.2% of all households were made up of individuals, and 65.7% had someone living alone who was 65 years of age or older. The average household size was 2.21 and the average family size was 2.79.

In the town the population was spread out, with 24.1% under the age of 18, 6.5% from 18 to 24, 19.1% from 25 to 44, 28.1% from 45 to 64, and 22.1% who were 65 years of age or older. The median age was 45 years. For every 100 females there were 87.7 males. For every 100 females age 18 and over, there were 79.8 males.

The median income for a household in the town was $19,500, and the median income for a family was $23,750. Males had a median income of $26,250 versus $17,321 for females. The per capita income for the town was $11,756. About 29.2% of families and 35.1% of the population were below the poverty line, including 64.5% of those under the age of eighteen and 13.5% of those 65 or over.

References

Cities in Montgomery County, Missouri
Cities in Missouri